Eslamiyeh (also Romanized as Eslāmīyeh; formerly Bāghestān-e Ferdows and Beheshtābād) is a city in, and the capital of, Eslamiyeh District of Ferdows County, South Khorasan province, Iran. At the 2006 census, its population was 5,167 in 1,515 households, when it was in the Central District. The following census in 2011 counted 6,084 people in 1,846 households. The latest census in 2016 showed a population of 7,108 people in 2,193 households.

After the census, Eslamiyeh District was established by combining Baghestan Rural District, Borun Rural District, and the city of Eslamiyeh. At the same time, Baghestan-e Olya's name changed to Baghestan and was raised to the level of a city. Baghestan-e Sofla became the new capital of Baghestan Rural District.

References 

Ferdows County

Cities in South Khorasan Province

Populated places in South Khorasan Province

Populated places in Ferdows County